John McNaughton (19 January 1912 – 27 June 1986) was a Scottish professional footballer who played as a left back in the English Football League for Nottingham Forest and Brighton & Hove Albion.

References

1912 births
1986 deaths
Footballers from Perth, Scotland
Scottish footballers
Association football fullbacks
Nottingham Forest F.C. players
Brighton & Hove Albion F.C. players
Scottish Junior Football Association players
English Football League players